McKey may refer to:

McKey, Oklahoma, census-designated place in Sequoyah County, Oklahoma, U.S.
McKey (surname)
McKey Sullivan (born 1988), American fashion model

See also
McKee (disambiguation)
Mackey (disambiguation)
Mackeys (disambiguation)
McKay (disambiguation)
Mackay (disambiguation)